Luka Mitrović (born 31 october 2005) is a Serbian professional basketball player for Crvena zvezda of the Adriatic League and the EuroLeague. Mitrovic was the final selection of the 2015 NBA draft.

Club career

Early years
Mitrović started playing basketball in Novi Sad-based club Kadet. In 2009, he moved to Hemofarm where he first played for the youth team. In the 2010–11 season, he signed his first professional contract.

Crvena zvezda (2012–2017)
In 2012, he signed a contract with Crvena zvezda. In the 2013–14 season, his role in the team increased, becoming off-the-bench player. He also played the EuroLeague for the first time in his career. Over 7 EuroLeague games, he averaged 3.6 points and 4 rebounds per game. Before the start of 2014–15 season, he was promoted in the team captain. On 21 November 2014 he posted a career-high 30 points in a double overtime 103–110 loss against Galatasaray. Over 24 EuroLeague games, he averaged 8.6 points, 5.2 rebounds and 2.3 assists per game, all career-high. In 2014–15 season, Crvena zvezda won the Adriatic League championship, the Serbian League championship and the Radivoj Korać Cup.

On 26 August he extended his contract with Crvena zvezda until 2017. On 18 October 2015, in a game against Union Olimpija, he suffered a left knee injury which should keep him off-the-court for a few months.

On 8 September 2016, he re-signed with the team until the end of 2017–18 season. In November 2016, he had minor muscle strain which kept him off the court for 10 days.

Stints in Europe (2017–2021)
On 29 June 2017, Mitrović signed a three-year contract with German club Brose Bamberg. In July 2018, he parted ways with the club.

On 10 January 2019, Mitrović joined UCAM Murcia. He averaged 4.9 points and 4.2 rebounds per game. On October 17, 2019, he signed with Manresa.

On 23 August 2020, Mitrović signed with Hapoel Jerusalem of the Israeli Premier League. He played his only game for Hapoel Jerusalem in the quarterfinals of the 2020 Basketball Champions League Final Eight.

On 21 October 2020, Mitrović signed with Budućnost of the Prva A Liga and the ABA League.

Back to Crvena zvezda (2021–present)
On June 18, 2021, he has signed with Crvena zvezda of the Adriatic League. The club won ABA League, Serbian League, and Serbian Cup in the 2021–22 season.

NBA draft rights
On 25 June 2015, Mitrović was the final pick of the 2015 NBA draft, after being selected by the Philadelphia 76ers.

On 10 July 2015, the Sacramento Kings acquired Mitrović and Artūras Gudaitis from the Philadelphia 76ers in exchange for Carl Landry, Jason Thompson, and Nik Stauskas.

Career achievements 
 Serbian League champion: 3  (with Crvena zvezda: 2014–15, 2015–16, 2016–17)
 Montenegrin League champion: 1 (with Budućnost: 2020–21)
 Radivoj Korać Cup winner: 5  (with Crvena zvezda: 2012–13, 2013–14, 2014–15, 2016–17, 2021–22)
 Montenegrin Cup winner: 1 (with Budućnost: 2020–21)
 Adriatic League champion: 4  (with Crvena zvezda: 2014–15, 2015–16, 2016–17, 2021–22)

Career statistics

EuroLeague

|-
| style="text-align:left;"| 2013–14
| style="text-align:left;" rowspan=4 | Crvena zvezda
| 7 || 5 || 13.9 || .409 || .125 || .750 || 4.0 || 1.0 || .4 || .3 || 3.6 || 6.7
|-
| style="text-align:left;"| 2014–15
| 24 || 20 || 24.7 || .429 || .175 || .780 || 5.2 || 5 || 1.0 || .2 || 8.6 || 9.7
|-
| style="text-align:left;"| 2015–16
| 4 || 1 || 14.3 || .500 || 1.000 || .500 || 2.5 || .3 || .0 || .5 || 3.3 || 4.0
|-
| style="text-align:left;"| 2016–17
| 28 || 27 || 15.7 || .450 || .167 || .536 || 2.3 || 1.4 || .5 || .1 || 4.1 || 4.3
|- class="sortbottom"
| style="text-align:center;" colspan=2| Career
| 63 || 53 || 18.6 || .438 || .187 || .679 || 3.6 || 1.6 || .7 || .2 || 5.8 || 6.6

Personal life 
Mitrović has been dating Nina Micić, a Serbian Olympic snowboarder and sister of basketball player Vasilije Micić.

See also 
 List of NBA drafted players from Serbia
 Philadelphia 76ers draft history

References

External links
Luka Mitrovic at acb.com 

 Luka Mitrović at aba-liga.com
 Luka Mitrović at draftexpress.com
 Luka Mitrović at eurobasket.com
 Luka Mitrović at euroleague.net
 Luka Mitrović at fiba.com

1993 births
Living people
ABA League players
Basketball League of Serbia players
Bàsquet Manresa players
Brose Bamberg players
CB Murcia players
Centers (basketball)
Hapoel Jerusalem B.C. players
KK Crvena zvezda players
KK Hemofarm players
KK Budućnost players
Liga ACB players
Philadelphia 76ers draft picks
Power forwards (basketball)
Serbian expatriate basketball people in Germany
Serbian expatriate basketball people in Israel
Serbian expatriate basketball people in Montenegro
Serbian expatriate basketball people in Spain
Serbian men's basketball players
Basketball players from Novi Sad